BEO, Beo, BeO or variation may refer to:

BEO
 Banquet event order
 Belmont Airport IATA code
 Book entry only
 Beyond Earth Orbit

Beo
 Beo, a variant of the name of the Anglo-Saxon god Beowa.
 Beo language, an African language
 Beo ar Éigean, an Irish-language podcast and radio programme

BeO
 beryllium oxide (BeO)

See also
 Beos (disambiguation)